Alma Holland Beers (1892-1974) was an American botanist known for being the first woman botanist at the University of North Carolina at Chapel Hill, including her work plant collecting, co-authoring multiple publications, and creating botanical illustrations.

References 

1892 births
1974 deaths
American women botanists
American botanists
20th-century American women
20th-century American people